Bani Jamra is a village in the north-west of Bahrain. It lies west of the capital Manama, east of the coastal village of Budaiya. It is administered under the Northern Governorate.

Before the discovery of oil in Bahrain, most of inhabitants were involved in farming, especially date palms. Bani Jamra is also famous as a center of traditional fabric weaving, a rapidly dying art.

History
In J. G. Lorimer's Gazetteer of the Persian Gulf (1908), he writes that the village consisted of 50 huts occupied by the Baharna, whom were mostly farmers and weavers. There were an estimated 1,500 palm trees in the village.

Notable residents
Mullah Attiya al-Jamri, Bahraini poet 
Abdul Amir al-Jamri, Bahraini opposition leader
Mansoor Al-Jamri, editor-in-chief of Al-Wasat
Nabeel Rajab, Bahraini human rights activist

References

External links
 Bani Jamra Cloth Weaving
 Bani Jamra website

Populated places in the Northern Governorate, Bahrain